The 2017–18 Bahraini King's Cup is the 16th season of the national football competition of Bahrain since it was renamed as the King's Cup in 2003 (named Emir Cup or Federation Cup before). The winners of the competition will earn a spot in the 2019 AFC Cup.

The competition started on 12 October 2017.

Round 1

Round of 16

First leg

Second leg

Quarter-finals

1st leg

2nd leg

Semi-finals

1st leg

2nd leg

Final

References

External links
Soccerway

Bahraini King's Cup seasons
King's Cup
Bahrain